The Democratic Republic of the Congo (DR Congo) first participated at the Olympic Games in 1968, when it was known as Congo Kinshasa.  The nation's next Olympic appearance was sixteen years later in 1984, when it was known as Zaire.  The nation has sent athletes to compete in every Summer Olympic Games since then, but has never participated in the Winter Olympic Games.  By the 2000 Games, the nation was once again designated Democratic Republic of the Congo.

No athlete from DR Congo has ever won an Olympic medal, making it the second most populous country in the world never to have done so, after Bangladesh.

The National Olympic Committee for DR Congo was created in 1963 and recognized by the International Olympic Committee in 1968.

Medal tables

Medals by Summer Games

See also
 List of flag bearers for the Democratic Republic of the Congo at the Olympics
 :Category:Olympic competitors for the Democratic Republic of the Congo

References

External links
 
 
 

 
Olympics